South Korean boy group 2AM have released four studio albums, four extended plays, and twenty singles. 2AM debuted with their first single "This Song" in 2008.

Albums

Studio albums

Reissues

Extended plays

Singles

Other charted songs

Collaborations

Soundtrack appearances

Videography

Video albums

Notes

References

Discographies of South Korean artists
K-pop music group discographies